Neath railway station is a main line railway station serving the town of Neath, south Wales. Managed by Transport for Wales, the station is located at street level on Windsor Road, situated back from the street fronting a small car park.

History

The surviving Neath railway station is one of four railway stations originally in Neath, and to distinguish it from the others was at one time named Neath General, the suffix being applied before Nationalisation. Neath Canalside served the Rhondda and Swansea Bay Railway services until they ended in 1963. Neath Riverside (also at times known as Neath Bridge Street and Neath Low Level), served trains to and from Brecon via the Neath and Brecon Railway, with an additional stop at Neath Abbey. The railway itself remains partly in use, linking Onllwyn and the docks. The remains of the Neath Bridge Street station can be seen by looking down at the railway alongside the river bridge just before Neath railway station in the Swansea direction.

Neath General also acted as the western passenger terminus of the Vale of Neath Railway for most of its life - trains running from here to Pontypool Road via  and  via a connecting curve at the west end of the station.  These ceased in June 1964 (when the line fell victim to the Beeching Axe) and the link line was lifted, though parts of the old VoNR remains intact (but disused) as far as Resolven and from Aberdare to Hirwaun.

The present station buildings date from 1974, when the old GWR structures dating from 1886/87 were demolished and rebuilt in contemporary style by British Rail.

Facilities

The station has 2 platforms both accessed through ticket barriers:
Platform 1, for westbound trains towards Swansea, Carmarthen and Milford Haven.
Platform 2, for eastbound trains towards Cardiff Central, London Paddington and Manchester Piccadilly

The station is fully staffed, with the ticket office open all week. A ticket machine is also provided for use and for collecting pre-paid tickets. Other amenities provided in the main building on platform 2 include a buffet, waiting room, pay phone and toilets. A waiting room is available on platform 1 and both platforms have CIS displays, automated announcements and timetable poster boards. Step-free access is available to the eastbound platform at all times and to the opposite side via a foot crossing when the station is staffed. However a public lift is provided on an overlooking footbridge. Both platforms are considered short, with neither platform being able to fully contain a GWR train.

Services

The station is served by Great Western Railway services between London Paddington and Swansea.

On Sundays the London - Swansea service runs hourly and the Milford Haven/Carmarthen - Manchester trains run every two hours.

References

External links

Railway stations in Neath Port Talbot
DfT Category D stations
Former Great Western Railway stations
Railway stations in Great Britain opened in 1877
South Wales Main Line
Railway stations served by Great Western Railway
Railway stations served by Transport for Wales Rail
Neath